Sisinnius (Sisinnios, also Sissinnios) may refer to:

Pope Sisinnius, Pope for about three weeks in 708
Sisinnius I of Constantinople, Archbishop of Constantinople from 426 to 427
Sisinnius II of Constantinople, Ecumenical Patriarch of Constantinople from 996 to 998
Saint Sisinnius, one of the martyred missionaries sent by Saint Vigilius of Trent
Saint Sisinnius of Parthia, depicted in "holy rider" charms of the Byzantine Period; see Gello
Susenyos I, Emperor of Ethiopia from 1608 to 1632
Susenyos II, Emperor of Ethiopia for about four months in 1770